This is a list of monuments in St. Julian's, Malta, which are listed on the National Inventory of the Cultural Property of the Maltese Islands.

List 

|}

References

Saint Julian's
St. Julian's, Malta